The Men's Long Jump F11 had its Final held on September 15 at 9:03.

Medalists

Results

References
Final

Athletics at the 2008 Summer Paralympics